Air Koryo is the state-owned flag carrier of North Korea, headquartered in Sunan-guyŏk, Pyongyang. Based at Pyongyang International Airport (IATA: FNJ), it operates international scheduled and charter services to destinations within Asia as well as flights on behalf of the Government of North Korea.

Air Koryo is banned in South Korea under the basis of the country's National Security Act and is subject to restrictions under Annex B of the Air Safety List of the European Union due to safety concerns.

History

Early years

In early 1950, SOKAO (Soviet–Korean Airline)) was established as a joint North Korean-Soviet venture to connect Pyongyang with Moscow. Regular flights began that same year. Services were suspended during the Korean War, resuming in 1953 as Bureau of Civil Aviation Ministry of Transport of DPRK  The state airline was then placed under the control of the Civil Aviation Administration of Korea (CAAK), starting operations on 21 September 1955 with Lisunov Li-2, Antonov An-2 and Ilyushin Il-12 aircraft. Ilyushin Il-14s and Ilyushin Il-18s were added to the fleet in the 1960s.

Jet operations commenced in 1975 when the first Tupolev Tu-154 was delivered for service from Pyongyang to Prague, East Berlin and Moscow. Because the Tu-154 had insufficient range, the aircraft refueled at Irkutsk and Novosibirsk. Tu-134s and An-24s were also delivered to start domestic services. The Tu-154 fleet was increased at the start of the 1980s, and the first Ilyushin Il-62 was delivered in 1982 (two of these aircraft are used in VIP configuration), allowing CAAK to offer a direct non-stop service to Moscow for the first time, as well as serving Sofia and Belgrade.

Expansion

The end of the Cold War and the collapse of communism in Eastern Europe saw a vast reduction in the number of international services offered. CAAK, re-branded as Air Koryo in March 1992 and in 1993, ordered three Ilyushin Il-76 freight aircraft to carry cargo to and from its destinations in China and Russia.

Air Koryo purchased a Tupolev Tu-204-300 aircraft in December 2007 and another in March 2010 to replace its aging international fleet. With the Tu-204, Air Koryo would be able to fly to Europe.

Due to safety and maintenance concerns, Air Koryo was added to the list of air carriers banned in the European Union in March 2006. The European Commission found evidence of serious safety deficiencies on the part of Air Koryo during ramp inspections in France and Germany. Air Koryo persistently failed to address these issues during other subsequent ramp inspections performed by the EU under the SAFA programme, pointing to blatant systemic safety deficiencies at Air Koryo operations. The airline failed to reply to an inquiry by the French Civil Aviation Authority regarding its safety operations, pointing to a lack of transparency or communication on the part of Air Koryo. The plan by Air Koryo for corrective action, presented in response to France's request, was found to be inadequate and insufficient. The EC also held that North Korean authorities did not adequately oversee the flag carrier, which it was obliged to do under the Chicago Convention. Therefore, on the basis of the common criteria, the Commission assessed that Air Koryo did not meet the relevant safety standards.

In September 2009, Air Koryo ordered an additional example of the Tupolev Tu-204-300 aircraft and a single Tupolev Tu-204-100.  Air Koryo was to receive its first of two Tupolev Tu-204-100B aircraft fitted with 210 seats. Flights to Dalian, China, were added to the Air Koryo schedule. Also, twice weekly Tu-134 flights from Pyongyang and direct services from Pyongyang to Shanghai Pudong were inaugurated with a two weekly service on JS522 and returning on JS523 in 2010.

In March 2010, Air Koryo was allowed to resume operations into the EU with their Tu-204 aircraft, which were fitted with the necessary equipment to comply with mandatory international standards. Currently, the Tu-204 is the only aircraft Air Koryo operates that is allowed into EU airspace. In April 2011, Air Koryo launched its first services to Malaysia with the inauguration of flights from Pyongyang to Kuala Lumpur. The flights operated twice a week utilizing the Tu-204, but were cancelled in mid-2017 due to sanctions imposed resulting from the poisoning murder of Kim Jong-nam at Kuala Lumpur International Airport by suspected North Korean agents.

In 2011, Air Koryo also inaugurated services to Kuwait City, being operated weekly by Tu-204 aircraft. The services operate during peak travel season – April to October.

In 2012, Air Koryo resumed flights to Kuala Lumpur but ceased the service in 2014 along with its expansion into Harbin, China. In 2012, Juche Travel Services, a company operating tours to North Korea, launched "aviation enthusiast" tours using chartered Air Koryo aircraft, which offered visitors the chance to fly on every type of Air Koryo aircraft within North Korea, the Mil-17, An-24, Tu-134, Tu-154, and Il-62. The international services were operated by An-148, Tu-154, or Tu-204.

In 2017, during the rule of North Korean Chairman Kim Jong-un, there were signs that Air Koryo was branching out into commercial sectors beyond aviation, providing goods and services as diverse as petrol stations, taxis, tobacco, soft drinks, and tinned pheasant meat.

As of 2021, two further Tupolev Tu-204-100B aircraft were allegedly prepared to be leased to Air Koryo, though they have both then been painted into the colours of Sky KG Airlines.

Destinations

Scheduled services are only operated from Pyongyang to Beijing, Chongjin, Macau, Samjiyon, Shenyang, and Vladivostok; additional destinations not listed on their website but showing up elsewhere as charters or seasonal charter services are also included.

The first regular charter flights between North Korea and South Korea began in 2003. The first Air Koryo flight operated by a Tu-154 touched down at Seoul's Incheon International Airport. Air Koryo operated 40 return services to Seoul, along with flights into Yangyang and Busan in South Korea. Inter-Korean charters from Hamhung's Sondok Airport to Yangyang International in South Korea began in 2002. Currently, there are no inter-Korean flights, due to laws in both countries. In 2014, Air Koryo operated a series of services to Seoul Incheon International Airport with Tu-204 and An-148 aircraft for the Asian Games.

Air Koryo operated an airline interline partnership with Aeroflot (SkyTeam) on services radiating from Vladivostok and Pyongyang until 2017 when it was forced to close the agreement due to newly imposed sanctions.

Fleet

Current fleet
Air Koryo operates the following fleet :

Tupolev Tu-204
The first Tupolev Tu-204-300 for Air Koryo was officially handed over to the carrier on 27 December 2007, and was ferried from Ulyanovsk to Pyongyang. It has been fitted out with 16 business class seats and the remaining 150 seats are economy. The Tu-204 aircraft are currently scheduled on all international flights out of Pyongyang. With the arrival of the new aircraft, a new seasonal route to Singapore was introduced and the resumption of the Pyongyang-Bangkok route commenced in 2008. Its first revenue-earning flight was made on 8 May 2008. Air Koryo operates another version of the Tu-204 jet, a Tu-204-100B, which they took delivery of on 4 March 2010. The Tu-204-300 is a shortened version of the Tu-204-100B. It started operating scheduled services on 5 March 2010. On 30 March 2010, the two Tupolev Tu-204 have been given the rights to operate into the European Union. The two Tu-204 remain the only planes the airline is allowed to operate on services to the EU.

Livery 
The Air Koryo livery consists of a white and grey fuselage and a horizontal red stripe along the windows dividing the upper and lower parts into white and grey respectively. The Korean name Air Koryo is painted above the windows and a North Korean flag is painted on the vertical stabilizer.

Accidents and incidents
On 30 June 1979, a Chosonminhang (predecessor to Air Koryo) Tupolev Tu-154B sustained landing gear and wing damage at Budapest Ferihegy Airport in Hungary. On final approach to Runway 31, the pilot realised the plane would undershoot and brought the nose of the plane up without applying power. The aircraft stalled, and with a hard landing, the right landing gear collapsed, causing the right wing to strike the ground and sustain substantial wing structure damage. There were no fatalities, and aircraft P-551 was subsequently repaired and returned to service.

On 1 July 1983, a Chosonminhang Ilyushin Il-62M on a non-scheduled international passenger flight from Pyongyang, North Korea (Pyongyang Sunan International Airport) to Conakry, Guinea (Conakry International Airport) crashed in the Fouta Djallon Mountains in Guinea. All 23 people on board died, and the aircraft was written off.

On 15 August 2006, an Air Koryo Tupolev Tu-154B P-551 on flight JS152 had a runway excursion while landing at Beijing Capital International Airport. The aircraft has been stored since. Previously, in 1976, this aircraft had been taxiing when it was damaged by an Aeroflot Tu-104 that lost control and crashed during takeoff.

On 22 July 2016, an Air Koryo Tupolev Tu-204-300 on a flight from Beijing to Pyongyang, flight number JS151, made an emergency landing at China's Shenyang Airport due to reports of smoke in the cabin. Oxygen masks were deployed due to an oxygen shortage.

References

Further reading

External links

 
 
  Air Koryo Virtual Tours by DPRK 360
 Swiss Website of Air Koryo at the Korean Friendship Association website Switzerland Delegation
 Air Koryo at the Aviation Safety Network Database
 CAAK (predecessor) at the Aviation Safety Network Database

Airlines banned in the European Union
Airlines of North Korea
Airlines established in 1954
Government-owned airlines